was a Japanese adventurer who was known particularly for his solo exploits. For example, he was the first person to reach the North Pole solo, the first person to raft the Amazon solo, and the first person to climb Denali solo. He disappeared a day after his 43rd birthday while attempting to climb Denali in the winter.

Early adventures
Uemura was born in Hidaka, now part of Toyooka, Hyōgo, Japan. Shy, he began climbing in college in the hope that mountaineering would increase his self-confidence.

Naomi Uemura was a licensed radio amateur operator, signed as JG1QFW. He used amateur radio communication during his expeditions.

Before his 30th birthday, Uemura had solo-climbed Mount Kilimanjaro, Aconcagua, Mont Blanc, and the Matterhorn, had walked the length of Japan, and summited during the first (1970) Japanese expedition to climb Mount Everest and subsequent disastrous 1971 International Everest Expedition.

North Pole and Greenland 
Uemura wrote that he almost gave up twice during his 1978 North Pole trip. On the fourth day of his trek, a polar bear invaded his camp, ate his supplies, and poked his nose against the sleeping bag where Uemura lay tense and motionless. When the bear returned the next day, Uemura was ready and shot him dead. On the 35th day of the trip, Uemura had hunkered down on an ice floe with his malamutes, when there was the roar of breaking the ice and the floe cracked into pieces. He and his dogs were stranded on a tossing island of ice. After a night of terror, Uemura found a  ice bridge and raced to safety.

He persevered and became the first ever to reach the North Pole solo. Describing his 57-day push, he wrote, "What drove me to continue then was the thought of countless people who had helped and supported me and the knowledge that I could never face them if I gave up." In this trip, he cooperated with the Canadian Air Force and received his supplies from its helicopters. After the trip, he questioned such extensive support and decided to carry supplies on his own back.

After the North Pole trip Uemura became the first person to complete a dogsled journey down the entire length of the Greenlandic ice sheet. He completed the trip from May 10 to August 22, 1978.
A commemorative plaque is located in Narsarsuaq in the south of Greenland.

First Denali ascent 
In August 1970, Uemura climbed Denali (then known as Mount McKinley) solo, becoming the first person to reach the top alone. He did this quickly and with a light pack (8 days up, versus an average of 14 days or so;  pack, versus an average probably twice that). August is after the end of the normal climbing season. While the weather he faced was not terrible, the mountain was almost empty with only four other people on it. Though many people have climbed Denali alone since Uemura, most do it in the middle of the climbing season.

Uemura dreamed of soloing across Antarctica and climbing that continent's highest peak, Vinson Massif. In preparation, in 1976 he did a solo sled-dog run from Greenland to Alaska, in two stages and 363 days.

Denali winter ascent
Uemura then prepared to climb Denali again solo in winter; however, for people unfamiliar with Alaskan climbing, the difficulty of a winter ascent can often be misjudged. Nobody had successfully climbed any large Alaskan peak in winter until 1967 when Gregg Blomberg organized an expedition that got to the top of Denali (Blomberg himself did not summit). This team lost one member and nearly lost the remaining members in a storm on the way down. Team member Art Davidson's book, Minus 148, recounts the events of the climb and was named after the storm that jeopardized the team.

There is a high degree of danger with glacier travel, and even short treks across the ice are considered hazardous. For example, glaciers are often broken with cracks, called crevasses, that are often covered with snow and not visible. Due to these occurrences as well as other underlying factors, an ascent is both very difficult and very dangerous to attempt without a team.
 
Uemura had developed a "self-rescue" device which consisted of bamboo poles tied over his shoulders. The poles would span any crevasse into which he fell and allow him to pull himself out. He planned a very light run, with only a  pack plus sled. He kept his gear light by planning to sleep in snow caves and therefore freeing himself from needing to carry a tent. He also skimped on fuel and planned to eat cold food.

He began his climb in early February 1984 and reached the summit on February 12. Sometime later, climbers would find the Japanese flag that he left at the summit.

Disappearance
He planned to reach the base camp in another two days but never made it.

Planes flew over the mountain but did not see him that day. He was spotted around  the next day (presumably on the ridge just above the headwall). However, complications with the weather made further searching difficult.
 
It was likely that Uemura was running out of fuel at this point, but because of his reputation, nobody wanted to send a rescue party for fear it would offend him. Doug Geeting, one of the bush pilots who had been "Uemura spotting" over the previous week, said, "If it were anybody else, we'd have somebody [a rescuer] on the mountain already". On February 20, the weather had cleared, and Uemura was nowhere to be found.

A diary found in the cave revealed that Uemura had left gear there to lighten his load on the summit push. Most people figured he had fallen on his descent of the headwall and been hurt, died, and was buried by snow.

A group of Japanese climbers arrived to look for the body.

The diary found in the  cave has been published in Japanese and English. It describes the conditions that Uemura suffered—the crevasse falls, −40° weather, frozen meat, and inadequate shelter. The diary entries showed him to be in good spirits and documented the songs he sang to stay focused on his task.

The last entry read, "I wish I could sleep in a warm sleeping bag. No matter what happens I am going to climb McKinley."

Legacy 
Uemura gave frequent public lectures and wrote about his travels. His adventure books for children were popular in Japan. There is a museum dedicated to him in Tokyo and another in Toyooka, Hyōgo.

An award named for him was created in Japan after his death. 

One of the best-known compositions of experimental guitarist Michael Hedges, "Because It's There", was a tribute to Uemura written for a film about the explorer's life.

He is remembered not only as a gifted climber and a driven adventurer but also as a gentle, self-effacing man who cared about others. In the words of Jonathan Waterman, "[Just as remarkable] as his solo achievements were his sincere modesty and unassuming nature. Another part of his greatness lay in his deep interest in everyone he met."

Notable climbs
 1968 Mount Sanford, Alaska, US. Solo ascent, fourth ascent of peak, topping out on September 19, 1968.

See also
 List of 20th-century summiters of Mount Everest
 List of people who disappeared
 Seven summits

Sources 
 The Rescue Season, Bob Drury 2001
 To the Top of Denali, Bill Sherwonit 2000
 High Alaska: A Historical Guide to Denali Mount Foraker and Mount Hunter, Jonathan Waterman 1989
 The north pole - Answers

Notes

1941 births
1980s missing person cases
1984 deaths
Amateur radio people
Explorers of the Arctic
Japanese explorers
Japanese mountain climbers
Japanese polar explorers
Japanese summiters of Mount Everest
Lost explorers
Missing person cases in Alaska
Mountaineering deaths
People from Hyōgo Prefecture
People's Honour Award winners
Sports deaths in Alaska